Daniel Louis Doctoroff (born July 11, 1958) is an American businessman and former government official. He is the chief executive officer of Sidewalk Labs, a startup company developing technology focused on city life. Previously, he was the CEO and president of Bloomberg L.P., deputy mayor for economic development and rebuilding for the New York City under Mike Bloomberg from January 2002 – December 31, 2007, led New York City's bid for the 2008 and 2012 Summer Olympics, and was a managing partner at Oak Hill Capital Partners, a private equity investment firm.

Early life 
Doctoroff was born in Newark, New Jersey. His father, Martin Myles Doctoroff (1932–2002), was a former FBI agent who left the organization when young Doctoroff was two years old and a Michigan Court of Appeals judge. His mother, Allene Doctoroff (née Miller; 1935–1999), was a psychologist who held a PhD. He grew up in Birmingham, Michigan, the oldest of four sons.

In 1980, Doctoroff received a B.A. degree in government from Harvard College and a J.D. degree from the University of Chicago Law School in 1984. One of his college roommates was Major League Baseball player Mike Stenhouse. Doctoroff's contracts professor in law school was future Supreme Court Justice Antonin Scalia and his torts professor was legal scholar Richard Epstein.

Career

Early career
Doctoroff began his career as an investment banker, working for Lehman Brothers in New York City, where his mentor was Peter Solomon. He later became managing partner at Oak Hill Capital Partners, a private equity investment firm.

Olympic bid
In 1994, after attending a World Cup soccer match between Italy and Bulgaria, Doctoroff was inspired to bring such competition to New York City as host of the 2008 Olympic games. Largely unknown in political, sporting and business circles of New York, Doctoroff connected with political consultant Robert Teeter, under whom Doctoroff worked as a Republican political pollster while he was a student at Harvard. Through Teeter, Doctoroff met with the Metropolitan Transportation Authority, New York City Partnership, and then-mayor Rudy Giuliani and began to move forward with his plans to bring the Olympics to New York.

Although the U.S. Olympic Committee decided not to pursue a U.S. bid for the 2008 Olympic Games, Doctoroff continued his efforts and formed NYC2012, shifting his focus from the 2008 to the 2012 summer games. The NYC2012 plan called for construction of new stadiums, transportation improvements and environmental clean-up efforts. Although London was ultimately selected to host the 2012 summer games, Doctoroff's Olympic efforts helped catalyze longstanding infrastructure and development projects in New York such as the extension of the No. 7 subway line. As a result of his involvement with NYC2012, Doctoroff was asked to join the Bloomberg administration in late 2001 as deputy mayor for economic development and rebuilding.

Bloomberg administration
During his first term as deputy mayor, Doctoroff continued to focus on developing neglected areas of the cities Five-Borough Economic Opportunity Plan. In total, Doctoroff oversaw 289 separate projects and initiatives, including the rezoning of 6,000 city blocks, the creation of 130 million square feet of residential and commercial space, and 2,400 acres of new parks, including the High Line, Brooklyn Bridge Park and Governor's Island. He also represented city interests in the redevelopment of Lower Manhattan after the devastation of 9/11. Doctoroff was responsible for initiatives to build the new Yankee Stadium, Citi Field, and the Barclays Center,  and expand the campuses of Columbia University, New York University, and Fordham University.  Doctoroff was also responsible for overseeing the creation of the New Marketplace Housing Plan, which developed or preserved 165,000 units of affordable housing. 

Doctoroff conceived of and led the team that developed PlaNYC, the 127-point plan that brought together more than 25 City agencies to make New York City more environmentally sustainable. In December 2012, he argued the changes made as a result of PlaNYC helped prevent further damage to the city from Hurricane Sandy, particularly in areas designated as flood zones. One of the 127 points of the plan was the introduction of congestion pricing, which is a system of fees to discourage commuting by car. Supporters, including Doctoroff, anticipated that the fees would help finance mass transit system improvements, reduce greenhouse gas emissions by 30% citywide by 2030 and reduce traffic congestion. A study conducted by the NYC Metropolitan Transit Authority in 2007, however, revealed that subway lines were at capacity and could not accommodate an increase in new riders using the system. Congestion pricing was eventually dismissed by New York state legislators in April 2008, claiming the fee was unfair to middle-class commuters who did not have access to mass transit.

Bloomberg L.P.
Doctoroff left city politics before the congestion pricing proposal failed and became president of Bloomberg L.P. in February 2008. Under Doctoroff's leadership, Bloomberg L.P. shifted its focus from providing financial information and analysis to its network of Terminal subscribers, to building a news organization targeted to a broader business audience. These efforts included the development of a strategy to increase the readership of Bloomberg.com, the acquisition of BusinessWeek and the creation of new subscription services Bloomberg Government and Bloomberg Law.

According to The New York Times, 85 percent of Bloomberg L.P.'s revenue comes from sales of its terminals, which then helps support the subscription-based news services. The news operation employs 2,300 journalists in 146 bureaus and 72 countries. In an interview with the American Journalism Review, Doctoroff describes a relationship where increasing the news audience helps increase the influence of the terminals and move the company closer to its goal of being "the most influential news organization in the world."

Under Doctoroff, Bloomberg L.P. surpassed rival Thomson Reuters in market share and started to expand operations in countries with emerging markets, like hedge funds in Korea. In the wake of the Libor scandal, Doctoroff told the European Parliament that Bloomberg LP could develop an alternative index called the Bloomberg Interbank Offered Rate that would address regulators' concerns.

Doctoroff left Bloomberg L.P. in 2014, with Michael Bloomberg re-assuming the role of CEO.

Sidewalk Labs
In 2015, Doctoroff and Google formed a start-up called Sidewalk Labs, focused on developing technology to improve urban life. Doctoroff is the CEO, and Alphabet (Google's holding company) is funding the company.

In 2017 Sidewalk Labs announced a plan to get in on the redevelopment of a  parcel of land on Toronto's waterfront, equipping the parcel with the latest technology for connecting people. The plan triggered some controversy, when first announced, and much greater controversy when the Labs suggested expanding its footprint to a much larger parcel under redevelopment. Critics voiced fears that residents and passersby would not realize how much privacy they were abandoning by entering the parcel. Doctoroff announced the Labs were dropping their plans on May 7, 2020.

During his time at Sidewalk Labs, the company launched several companies, including: Replica, Sidewalk Infrastructure Partners, CityBlock Health, Pebble, Mesa, and Delve.

In December 2021, Doctoroff announced he was resigning as CEO as a result of developing symptoms that align with amyotrophic lateral sclerosis, from which his father and uncle died. He would later be diagnosed with the disease.

Other activities
In February 2013, Doctoroff announced that he was working with Mike Bloomberg and Carlyle Group co-founder David Rubenstein to put together a $25 million donation to support research for finding a cure to Amyotrophic lateral sclerosis (ALS). Doctoroff's father died of ALS in 2002, and his uncle Michael died of ALS in 2010.

In 2013, Doctoroff became President and Chairman of a non-profit organization created to build a new arts facility at Hudson Yards, originally known as Culture Shed. During his term as Deputy Mayor, Doctoroff led the process of site preservation for The Shed as part of the redevelopment of Manhattan's Far West Side. Doctoroff also led efforts to raise $636 million for the Shed's construction and launch, oversaw the construction of the building and led the search to recruit Alex Poots as the Shed's first CEO and artistic director. The Shed opened in 2019.

In 2013, Doctoroff founded Target ALS, a medical research foundation, with Bloomberg Philanthropies and David Rubenstein, following the death of Doctoroff's father and uncle from Amyotrophic Lateral Sclerosis. He donated $10 million of his personal wealth to the foundation. Target ALS has funded Cambridge biotech Biogen's clinical trials of an experimental drug purchased from Karyopharm Therapeutics in 2018. In late 2021, Doctoroff announced his own diagnosis with ALS, stating that he would "dedicate my life to battling this disease," beginning with a new $250 million fundraising effort.

Doctoroff is a member of the board of directors of Bloomberg Philanthropies and is both founder and chair of the board of Target ALS.

Doctoroff is chairman and President of the board of directors of The Shed, the arts facility at the Hudson Yards development in New York City.

In March 2015, Doctoroff was appointed to the United States Olympic Committee board of directors.

In September 2017, Doctoroff's book Greater Than Ever: New York's Big Comeback, was published by PublicAffairs/Hachette Book Group.

Doctoroff was a member of the advisory board for Neom, Saudi Arabia's plan to build a futuristic "mega city" in the desert.

Personal life 
After meeting at Harvard during their first year, Doctoroff married Alisa Robbins in 1981. He is Jewish, and in 2013 Alisa Robbins Doctoroff was appointed the president of the UJA-Federation of New York; previously she served as president of Congregation Or Zarua in Manhattan. The couple has three children and resides in New York City.

Doctoroff is a second cousin of New York Times domestic correspondent Katherine Rosman. His grandmother, Jennie Miller née Seeman, (1906-1992) was a sister of Rosman's grandmother, Mae Rosman née Seeman (1917-1987).

References

External links
 

1958 births
American chief executives of financial services companies
American publishing chief executives
Bloomberg L.P. people
Businesspeople from Newark, New Jersey
Deputy mayors of New York City
Harvard College alumni
Living people
People from Birmingham, Michigan
University of Chicago Law School alumni
People with motor neuron disease